Leon S. Peters was a businessman, licensed engineer, and philanthropist in California's San Joaquin Valley. Peters was born in 1905 in the city of Fowler, California to Samuel and Lily Peters who were Armenian immigrants from Bitlis. Between 1926 and 1929 Peters worked for his uncle's grape packing business  where he would be recruited as a salesman for Valley Foundry and Machine Works. In 1940 Peters purchased the company from its owners. During World War II Peters became the president of the Central California War Industries company which was later awarded the Army-Navy E award. After the war he continued his role in manufacturing as President of Valley Foundry and Machine Works and became known for helping raise money for the expansion California State University, Fresno and the Community Medical Center. Know for being active in the local community Peters was a member of the Fresno Chamber of Commerce, Masons, and Rotary; in 1961 he founded the Leon S Peters Foundation.

Honorary degrees 
In 1996 Leon Peters was posthumously awarded an honorary doctorate from California State University, Fresno.

San Joaquin College of Law awarded an honorary Juris Doctor.

References 

Ethnic Armenian businesspeople
1905 births
1983 deaths
People from Fresno County, California
American Freemasons